Pest from the West is the first short subject starring American comedian Buster Keaton made for Columbia Pictures. Keaton made a total of ten films for the studio between 1939 and 1941.

Synopsis
Keaton is a millionaire vacationing in Mexico traveler who falls in love with a señorita (Lorna Gray) and sets out to win her.

Production
This was the first film made by Columbia Pictures starring Keaton and was a condensed remake of his English-made feature film The Invader (1935). Keaton's silent-era writer Clyde Bruckman collaborated on the screenplay and it was directed by comedy veteran Del Lord. The supporting cast features Columbia regulars Lorna Gray, Gino Corrado, Richard Fiske, Bud Jamison, Eddie Laughton, and Ned Glass with the voices of short-subject stars Charley Chase and Curly Howard heard on the soundtrack.

Much of Pest from the West was filmed on location at Balboa, California, United States (Keaton repeatedly falls off his boat, into Balboa Bay). The Mexican-village settings were adapted from sets used in Columbia's 1937 feature film Lost Horizon.

Reception
Pest from the West was a huge hit in theaters, and earned rave reports from exhibitors. Keaton starred in nine more Columbia shorts, the last of which was She's Oil Mine. Like Pest from the West, this borrowed content from an older Keaton feature, The Passionate Plumber.

The Film Daily called the short "one of the funniest shorts of the season. In fact, of any season. It just goes to prove that this Buster Keaton feller is a natural B.O. gold mine that is not being mined."

References

External links

Pest from the West at the International Buster Keaton Society

1939 films
1939 comedy films
Columbia Pictures short films
American black-and-white films
Films directed by Del Lord
Films with screenplays by Buster Keaton
American comedy short films
1930s English-language films
1930s American films